Ae (Ӕ ӕ; italics: Ӕ ӕ) is a letter of the Cyrillic script, used exclusively in the Ossetian language to represent the near open central vowel . Its ISO 9 transliteration is ⟨æ⟩ but some transliteration schemes may render it as ⟨ä⟩. It looks identical to the Letter Æ (Æ æ Æ æ) in the Latin script.

History
The letter was first used in Anders Johan Sjögren's Cyrillic alphabet in 1844 and appeared first in fiction and poetry books published at the beginning of the 20th century. It was preserved during the shift to a Latin alphabet and the reversion to a Cyrillic alphabet. It is one of the most common letters in the Ossetian language. 

The letter was also found in the Lezgin alphabet of 1911.

Computing codes

See also
 Latin Æ
Ligature (writing)

Ae
Ossetian language